The BRM class is a diesel electric locomotive designed and built in-house by Southern Shorthaul Railroad in Australia. It is an evolution of the VL class built by Avteq for Chicago Freight Car Leasing Australia. Features include Wabtec Fastbrake and QES3 traction control.

References

External links
BRM class Consolidated Rail Leasing
BRM class Vicsig

Diesel-electric locomotives of Australia
Co-Co locomotives
Railway locomotives introduced in 2012
Standard gauge locomotives of Australia